Kristoffer Paulsen Vatshaug (born Kristoffer Paulsen, 3 June 1981) is a retired Norwegian footballer. He played for IL Sverre, Steinkjer FK, Levanger FK, FK Bodø/Glimt, IK Start and Molde FK.

He retired after the 2013 season, and was hired as a developer in the Football Association of Norway.

Career statistics 

Source: nifs.no

Honours
Molde
 Tippeligaen (2): 2011, 2012
 Norwegian Football Cup (1): 2013

References 

  Player profile on official club website

1981 births
Living people
People from Levanger
Norwegian footballers
Norway under-21 international footballers
FK Bodø/Glimt players
IK Start players
Molde FK players
Eliteserien players
Steinkjer FK players
Association football defenders
Sportspeople from Trøndelag